Stelnica is a commune located in Ialomița County, Muntenia, Romania. It is composed of three villages: Maltezi, Retezatu and Stelnica.

References

Communes in Ialomița County
Localities in Muntenia